Life of Moses may refer to:

the life of Moses as recorded in the Bible
Life of Moses, a work by Philo
Life of Moses, a work by Gregory of Nyssa
Life of Moses, a Slavic translation of the Hebrew Chronicle of Moses
Life of Moses, a cycle of frescoes in the Sistine Chapel
The Life of Moses, a 1909 American silent epic film